Accomac may refer to:

Geography
Accomac, Virginia, a town in Virginia
Accomac Shire, a former county in Virginia of which the town was the county seat
Accomac, Pennsylvania

Peoples 
 Accomac people, a historic Native American tribe from the Eastern Shore of Virginia

Ships
, three ships of the US Navy

See also
Accomack County, Virginia, the current incarnation of Accomac Shire
Plymouth, Massachusetts was built on a site identified on early maps as Accomack